Lakeside Country Park is a country park just south of the town of Eastleigh in Hampshire.  The park covers 60 acres and is home to the Eastleigh Lakeside Steam Railway.

The park is on the site of old gravel workings, with lakes formed from gravel pits.  As well as the lakes themselves, the park boasts meadows and some young woodland.

The park is bounded by the Eastleigh urban area to the north, the A335 road to the east, the boundary between Eastleigh and Southampton to the south, and Monks Brook to the west.

Eastleigh Lakeside Railway 

A dual gauge  /  light railway was established in the park in 1992, originally as a temporary layout.  A more permanent track was laid down in 1993, as the railway company was granted a three-year lease.  Five years later, a longer lease was negotiated and construction began on the two stations, Eastleigh Parkway and Monks Brook.  They were opened in 1999, although further work on the layout itself was carried out in 2000.  A tunnel was added in 2003, and Eastleigh Parkway station was extended in 2005 with the addition of a café and shop.

Water sports centre 
In 2014 funding was approved towards the replacement of the lakeside buildings with two new buildings with improved toilets and changing facilities, storage, offices and a multi-purpose function room. The estimated cost of the scheme is £2.5 million, of which £1 million had been allocated from the New Homes Bonus and £371,000 from the Eastleigh Local Area Committee. The new buildings were completed in late 2016.

Open water swimming clubs have been run from the venue since at least 2010, and, as of 2017, swimming sessions are currently operated  by HOWL Multisports.

References

External links

 HOWL Multisports
Pictures of The Eastleigh Lakeside Railway

7¼ in gauge railways in England
Country parks in Hampshire
Miniature railways in the United Kingdom
Borough of Eastleigh